Jai Radhe Krishna is a 1974 Bollywood devotional film directed by Yeshwant Pethkar. Music was composed by Vasant Desai with lyrics by Yogesh Gaud. The film stars Mohan Choti, Satyajeet, Anupama, Jayshree T. and S. N. Tripathi.

References

External links
 

1974 films
1970s Hindi-language films
1974 drama films